Aisy-sous-Thil (literally Aisy under Thil) is a commune in the Côte-d'Or department in the Bourgogne-Franche-Comté region of eastern France.

Geography
Aisy-sous-Thil is about 35 km south-east of Avalon and about 25 km south of Montbard.  The Route d'Avalon, (Highway D70) passes directly through the heart of the commune from Avalon in the west to Vitteaux in the east although it does not pass through the village. The village is north of the D70 and can be reached by the Highway D15J off the D70. The Highway D15J passes out of the commune to the south-west and links to Lacour-d'Arcenay. Highway D980 also links with the D70 in the south-east corner of the commune.  Highway D36 proceeds north out of the commune.  The Autoroute du Soleil (A6/E15) passes about 2 km to the east of the commune.  Most of the commune is farmland with some forests in the south-west and north-west. The village of Pont d'aisy is the only other village in the commune—to the south-east of Aisy-sour-Thil village.

The Serein stream forms the eastern border of the commune and the Portrait Stream forms the southern border.  There are several ponds in the commune the largest of which is the Etang de Sarmeaux near the D15J south-west of the town.

Administration

List of Successive Mayors of Aisy-sous-Thil

Population

Personalities
Edith Royer, founder of the Brotherhood "Prayer and Penance" of Montmartre, was born in the commune.

See also
 Aisy cendré
 Communes of the Côte-d'Or department
 Morvan Regional Natural Park

References

External links

 Aisy-sous-Thil on the National Geographic Institute Website

Communes of Côte-d'Or